Simon Tsotang Maine (born August 10, 1974 in Ha Molengoane, Ratau, Lesotho) is a Basotho long-distance runner who competed in the men's marathon event at the 2008 Summer Olympics.
He was the flag bearer of Lesotho during the 2008 Summer Olympics opening ceremony.

References 

1974 births
Living people
Athletes (track and field) at the 2008 Summer Olympics
Lesotho male long-distance runners
Lesotho male marathon runners
Olympic athletes of Lesotho
Athletes (track and field) at the 2006 Commonwealth Games
Commonwealth Games competitors for Lesotho
People from Maseru District